Hellboy: Blood and Iron is the second in the Hellboy Animated series (the first being Hellboy: Sword of Storms), written by Tad Stones and Mike Mignola. It first aired on March 10, 2007 on Cartoon Network, and aired again on July 19, 2008 to promote the release of Hellboy II: The Golden Army, and was released on DVD by Anchor Bay Entertainment on June 12, 2007. The film's storyline is based in part upon the Hellboy: Wake the Devil storyline from the original comics.

The title is a reference to Otto von Bismarck's famous "Blood and Iron speech."

Also included on the DVD is the short film Iron Shoes, which is based on the Hellboy story of the same name. The Iron Shoes demon is voiced by Dan Castellaneta.

Plot
In 1939, shown in a series of flashbacks played in reverse chronological order, Professor Trevor Bruttenholm investigates a series of murders in Eastern Europe. Erzebet Ondrushko, a vampire who bathed in the blood of innocents to stay young, was responsible. She had sold her soul to the Queen of Witches, the goddess Hecate, and most recently kidnapped the fiancée of one of the townsmen. When the search party, including the local priest, Father Lupescu, confronts Erzebet in her castle, all members of the party are horribly killed, and Bruttenholm must face the vampire alone. He tricks her into the sunlight, effectively destroying her, but her ashes swirl back into the castle to find sanctuary in her iron maiden.

In the present day, an elderly Bruttenholm, overcome with memories of his encounter with Erzebet, takes a particular interest in a publicity stunt case in the Hamptons on Long Island. A haunting has been reported in a mansion recently purchased by developer Oliver Trumbolt, a friend of a U.S. Senator with hands deep in the BPRD's budget, and considered a low priority. Bruttenhom insists that their most advanced team should go: Liz Sherman, Abe Sapien, Hellboy, and junior agent Sydney Leach as well as himself (to everyone's surprise). Bruttenholm does not explain his motives at first.

The BPRD team arrives at Trumbolt's site and sets up to investigate the haunting. Despite a few open windows, a creepy lifelike replica of Erzabet, artifacts from her castle, and an old, suspiciously familiar-looking groundskeeper, everything seems normal until night falls and they each encounter strange ghostly apparitions, culminating in dozens of spirits of Erzabet's former victims. Excited that he may have found a goldmine, Trumbolt ignores the professor's warnings and is attacked.

Using his abilities to detect metal, Leach finds a secret passageway through the house's cellar, inadvertently coming across Trumbolt's body, drained of blood. The blood has been placed in a bathtub, apparently for Erzabet's revival. Bruttenholm and Liz head for the gardens to stop Hecate and Erzabet's Harpy-Hags from summoning her back from the dead. The aged groundskeeper, actually Father Lupescu who is in thrall to the vampire, is transformed into a werewolf by the harpies and sent to attack the team. Abe is knocked out and taken by the harpies for experimentation while Hellboy fights the werewolf, ultimately killing it.

Liz and Bruttenholm are attacked, first by demonic wolves to delay them from stopping the ritual, then by Erzabet in a restored but withered body, who knocks Liz out, beats Hellboy through a hole in the courtyard, and takes Bruttenholm back to the mansion. Erzabet bathes in Trumbolt's blood and rejuvenates herself, but she begins to wither and decay again – Bruttenholm poisoned the blood with Holy Water. He stakes the vampire through the heart, and she turns back to dust. Freed from their torment, the spirits of the house fade away, including Father Lupescu.

Meanwhile, under the mansion, Hellboy meets Hecate, who is perplexed as to why he helps the mortals, and tries to lure him to the dark side. He bluntly refuses again and again, battling Hecate's snakes as he tries to re-enter the mansion. Erzabet's death further enrages Hecate, who possesses the iron maiden, reshapes it into a semblance of her true form, and brutally attacks Hellboy. Abe escapes the harpies, after which they find Hecate fighting Hellboy;  one is killed by Hecate's thrashing tail and the other flies away. Leach, Liz, and Abe attempt to help Hellboy stop the goddess, but are unsuccessful. A badly-wounded Hellboy realizes Hecate's weakness is the sun; he lures her outside, forcing her back into the darkness of her own realm, defeated. The film ends with Broom, watching over Hellboy's recovery, sitting next to him.

Cast
 Ron Perlman – Hellboy
 Doug Jones – Abe Sapien
 Selma Blair – Liz Sherman
 John Hurt – Trevor Bruttenholm
 Rob Paulsen – Sydney Leach; Anna's Fiancé
 Peri Gilpin – Kate Corrigan
 Jim Cummings – Tom Manning
 James Arnold Taylor – Father Lupescu; Young Trevor Bruttenholm
 J. Grant Albrecht – Oliver Trumbolt
 Cree Summer – Hecate
 Kath Soucie – Erzebet Ondrushko
 Dee Dee Rescher – Harpy-Hag #1
 Grey DeLisle – Harpy-Hag #2; Anna

Crew
 Ginny McSwain – Voice Director

References

External links
 
 
 Hellboy Animated Series Production Diary
 The Hellboy Archive

2007 television films
2007 films
Blood and Iron
2007 action films
2007 fantasy films
2000s animated superhero films
American animated fantasy films
American animated science fiction films
Demons in film
Films produced by Guillermo del Toro
2000s American animated films
Toonami
Film Roman films
Revolution Studios films
Publicity stunts in fiction
Films directed by Victor Cook
Superhero horror films